The 2015 United States Women's Curling Championship was held from February 14 to 21 at the Wings Stadium in Kalamazoo, Michigan. It was held in conjunction with the 2015 United States Men's Curling Championship. The Aileen Sormunen rink will represent the United States at the 2015 World Women's Curling Championship in Sapporo, Japan.

Teams
There will be ten teams participating in this year's national championship. The teams are listed as follows:

Round robin standings
Final round robin standings

Round robin results
All draw times listed in Eastern Standard Time (UTC−5).

Draw 1
Saturday, February 14, 4:30 pm

Draw 2
Sunday, February 15, 8:00 am

Draw 3
Sunday, February 15, 4:00 pm

Draw 4
Monday, February 16, 8:00 am

Draw 5
Monday, February 16, 4:00 pm

Draw 6
Tuesday, February 17, 10:00 am

Draw 7
Tuesday, February 17, 8:00 pm

Draw 8
Wednesday, February 18, 12:00 pm

Draw 9
Wednesday, February 18, 8:00 pm

Playoffs

1 vs. 2
Thursday, February 19, 8:00 pm

3 vs. 4
Thursday, February 19, 8:00 pm

Semifinal
Friday, February 20, 4:00 pm

Final
Saturday, February 21, 10:00 am

Statistics

Perfect games

References

External links

2015 in curling
Sports in Kalamazoo, Michigan
United States Women's Curling Championship
2015 in American sports
Women's curling competitions in the United States
Curling in Michigan
United States National Curling Championships